Rhinoprora is a genus of moths in the family Geometridae first described by Warren in 1895. The Global Lepidoptera Names Index lists this genus as a junior subjective synonym of Pasiphila Meyrick, 1883.

Species
Rhinoprora oribates
Rhinoprora palpata

References

Eupitheciini